Gecko Turner (born Fernando Gabriel Echave Peláez, 1966) is a Spanish musician and singer-songwriter. Based near the border between Spain and Portugal, he has fronted several bands in his native Spain. Guapapasea, his first CD released in the U.S., incorporates bossa nova, soul, funk, reggae, jazz and electronica.

Gecko Turner grew up in Spain, learning English from the blues artists he loved. After a long musical journey, he started composing in a style that combined jazz, blues, samba, reggae, hip-hop, and more into something all his own. Journalists in Spain dubbed it 'Afromeño' (rough translation: African and Extremeño, being Extremadura the region where he comes from), but the sound owes as much to North and South America, the Caribbean and Europe,  as it does to Africa. All of his work has been published by Lovemonk Records, in cd and vinyl. Also, Californian label Quango Music Group has published in the United States an American edition of the album "Guapapaséa", as well as several singles.

Biography
Gecko Turner (born Fernando Gabriel Echave Peláez) was raised in Badajoz, Spain, a mid-sized town about halfway between Lisbon and Madrid. As a teenager he fell in love with The Beatles, The Rolling Stones, and Bob Dylan, as well as soaking up the international and Spanish music he heard on the radio. Hearing the Stones sent him on a quest for the music that inspired Jagger and company, and he discovered Elmore James, Lead Belly, Muddy Waters, Jimmy Reed, Big Joe Turner, and other blues artists. He taught himself guitar in his teens and formed a band to cover American and British pop from The Kinks to David Bowie, Talking Heads to James Brown. In his late teens, Turner discovered jazz, finding a special affinity for the Afro-Cuban sounds of Dizzy Gillespie. He hitched all over Spain to follow Gillespie on tour, listening to bebop and reading Jack Kerouac. At 20 he moved to London and busked in tube stations with a borrowed guitar. He did not make much money, but learned how to grab a crowd's attention. He also soaked up London's jazz scene. He returned to Badajoz for his mother's funeral, got married, and took a job in a bank, working nights so he did not have to cut his hair or take out his earrings. When his wife died after a long illness, Turner quit the bank and went back to music full-time.

His first band as a singer, guitarist, and songwriter was called The Animal Crackers, a Joy Division-meets-Sonic Youth aggregation that delighted in its own noise-making. They made two albums and Turner almost went deaf. He quit and started The Revrendoes with his boyhood friend Gene Garcia. He played acoustic guitar while Garcia would blow the blues harp and do his impressions of a Southern American Baptist preacher. In the mid-'90s, Turner moved to Merida and got a job in a 24-track, two-inch tape analog recording studio—the studio where The Animal Crackers albums – Work my body (Jammin', 1992) and Sounds like a hit (Jammin', 1996) were recorded. He learned how to produce records and started Perroflauta ( Flute Dog, a term used for people with a lifestyle similar to Gutter Punks and Hippies.) with Alvaro "Dr. Robelto" Fernandes, bass; Edú Nascimento, guitar; César González, drums, percussion; Irapoan Freire, trumpet; Rogerio Da Sousa, percussion; Rodney d'Assis, percussion; and Markos Bayón, guitar and vocals. Half the band was Brazilian, and they played a blend of samba and reggae. They made several CDs and toured all over Spain. When he went to the copyright office to register his songs, the form had a space for both proper name and an alias. He'd been nicknamed Gecko since boyhood and loved the music of Big Joe Turner, and wrote down Gecko Turner on a whim. When the copyright office sent him a confirmation order addressed to Gecko Turner, he took it as a sign and began using it as his stage name.

When Perroflauta broke up, Turner made demos of the new tunes he had been writing that combined the Brazilian reggae he'd been playing with the blues and rock he'd always loved. Gecko spent his last $1,000 to book time in a small studio in Madrid. He finished the album, and enlisted the big names that helped him make Guapapasea! by promising to pay them when he got a record deal. Lovemonk, a new indie label, put out the album in Europe and Japan, allowing him to pay off the studio and his friends. Turner, who sings in English, Spanish, and Portuguese, put together a band he called the Afrobeatnik Orchestra and toured to support the album. Guapapasea! won Spain's Premio Extremadura a la Creación in 2005, given each year to writers and musicians who have created work that furthers the recognition of the Spanish language as a creative medium. This album was also published by Quango Records in the United States, and this led to a promo tour and several concerts in radio and television in Los Angeles, New York City and Texas, playing prestigious venues like Knitting Factory, in Hollywood, or the vibrant SOB's, in Greenwich Village.

His follow-up album, Chandalismo Illustrado (Sweatsuits Illustrated), is heavy on the funk, with highlife, various Cuban rhythms, and a Tom Waits tribute adding to his already eclectic blend. It was considered by English magazine Swell one of the best 20 records of the year, including all genres and styles, and also acclaimed as revelation of the year by the readers of El Pais EP3. He continued playing concerts in Spain, Denmark, Sweden and Germany, where he plays in Berlin during the 2006 FIFA World Cup. In September, the album was also released in Japan by Argus Records, so he played a concert in Tokyo for his Japanese fans.

In 2007 Gecko Turner moves to the United States, and started working on new songs and doing recording session with musicians in Austin and Los Angeles. Next year Lovemonk Records released a cd called Manipulado, which compiles different remixes of Gecko's songs already published in 7" and 12" vinyls. In 2009, Gecko is deep into finishing his next album, Gone Down South. It was published (both in vinyl and cd) in 2010 by Lovemonk Records, with an artwork style that evokes that old sixties jazz covers. The first single was "Truly", a rendition of the classic Motown productions that he loves so much.

During the last years, Gecko Turner's songs have been required by over 70 compilations released all over the world, and they have been used in several TV commercials and a few films, like Isabel Coixet Elegy, Montxo Armendáriz Obaba, No tengas miedo and Mexican director Jorge Colon's Cansada de besar sapos. Also, his work as a producer led him to work with such a different artists like Californian jazz and blues singer Brenda Boykin, and the flamenco singer (recently deceased) Fernando Terremoto, recording for both of them their albums, Chocolate and Chilli, and Terremoto.

Discography

Albums
 Guapapaséa (Lovemonk, 2003)
 Subterranean Homesick Blue
 Sabes Quien Te Quiere
 Limón en La Cabeza
 Te Estás Equivocando
 How Come You Do Me Like You Do Me?
 Rainbow Country
 Monka Mongas # Did Ya Black Up Today?
 Dime Que Te Quéa
 Niña Del Guadiana
Dizzie
 $45.000 (Guapa Pasea)

 Chandalismo Ilustrado (Lovemonk, 2006)
 En La Calle on the Street
 Monosabio Blues
 Que Papa E Esse
 Toda Mojaíta
 Coco Pinda
 Daughterbitchin' And Motherfuckin' Style
 Pal Peru
 Tieso (Y Sin Desayuna)
 Tontorronea
 48th African Davies
 'Fess It Girl
 Afrobeatnik
 Raise Up Standards
 Joyina
 Sycamore Blues

 Manipulado (Lovemonk, 2008)
 Monosabio – Philip Owusu Rmx
 $45.000 (Guapa Pesa) – Afrodisiac Soundsystem Rmx
 Tontorroneá – Gecko's Tonto Edit
 Un Limón En La Cabeza – Quantic Rmx
 En La Calle, On The Street – The Dining Rooms Afrojazz Rmx
 Rainbow Country – Instituto Mexicano Del Sonido Remix
 Toda Mojaíta – Dutch Rhythm Combo Rmx
 Sycamore Blues – Dublex Inc. Rmx
 Afrobeatnik – Seiji Rmx
 Tieso (Y Sin Desayuná) – Gordon Blackbeard's Scotch Mist Rmx
 Dizzie – Boozoo Bajou Rmx
 45.000 $ (Guapa Pasea) – Watch TV Remix
 Toda Mojaíta – Danny Lewis Afrofuturistic Mix
 Un Limón En La Cabeza- Quantic Dub

 Gone Down South (Lovemonk, 2010)
 Truly
 Cuanta Suerte
 So Sweet
 Tea Time
 Amame, Mimame
 You Can't Own Me
 Mbira Bira
 Holly Hollywood
 Let's Say Tonight
 The Love Monk
 When I Work Up
 Gone Down South.

 That Place by the Thing with the Cool Name (Lovemonk, 2015)
 I'll Do That
 Bee Eater
 Corazón De Jesús
 Chicken Wire
 Medium Rare
 Did You Ever Wonder Why?
 Here Comes Friday
 Oye, Muchacha
 Extremely Good
 Little Sonny
 Juanita
 Rockin' Diddley
 This Is The One
 The Strange Adventures Of Two Runaway Elephants in Kentish Town

Singles
 "Un limón en la cabeza" 7" (Lovemonk, 2004)
 "Guapapasea" 7" (Lovemonk, 2004)
 "Monka Mongas" / "Rainbow Country" 7" (Lovemonk, 2004)
 "Afrobeatnik" 12" (Lovemonk, 2006)
 "Toda Mojaíta" 12" (Lovemonk, 2007)
 "Monosabio Blues" 7" (Lovemonk, 2007)
 "Manipulado EP" 12" (Lovemonk, 2008)
 "Truly" 7" (Lovemonk, 2010)
 "You Can't Own Me" / "When I Woke Up Remixed" 12" (Lovemonk, 2011)
 "When I Woke Up" / "Ámame Mímame Remixed" 12" (Lovemonk, 2011)
 "That Place By The Remixes" (Lovemonk, 2015)

References

External links
Official website
Gecko Turner on Allmusic
Live Performance on Morning Becomes Eclectic
Interview with Gecko in Paisajes Eléctricos Magazine (in Spanish)
Gecko on Soul Train Online (in German)
Gone Down South review on All About Jazz

Singers from Extremadura
Living people
1966 births
Spanish male singers